Donwan Harrell is the founder and was the creative director of the New York-based luxury denim line Prps. He is also one of the former top 10 designers at Nike.

Early life 
Born in North Carolina and raised in Virginia, Donwan grew up in a lower-income family where his dad worked as a naval ship repairman and his mom, a seamstress. At an early age, Donwan developed a deep passion for sketching and sewing. He often helped his mother sew her own designs that she sold at local flea markets, and would sketch his surroundings to pass the time. His mother saw prodigy-like talent in his sketching and began entering him into art competitions to foster his talent. Along with sketching, he also began to design and sew his own clothing, selling it to his fellow students and friends.

The summer after eighth grade, before he began high school, Donwan began taking pre-collegiate art and drawing classes at RISD before attending Virginia Commonwealth University on a partial scholarship. After graduating with a BFA in fashion design from VCU in 1989, he entered the prestigious Chambre Syndicale international fashion design competition sponsored by Air France, winning two years in a row.

Career 
Donwan moved to New York City and garnered a job as associate menswear designer for Robert Stock. After a brief stint at Joseph Abboud, he became associate menswear designer for Donna Karan. Nike then recruited him as worldwide director for "Organized Team Sports" based in Hong Kong. Donwan created national uniforms for the 2002 World Cup including Italy, Nigeria, Brazil, United States, Korea, Japan, Poland, and the Netherlands. Additionally, he designed uniforms for many international team sports including rugby, baseball, basketball and football.

Poised to start his own clothing company, Donwan launched Prps in 2002. What started originally as a denim brand is today made up of three collections: Prps Noir, Prps and Prps Goods & Co. Prps Noir is the more expensive range of the collection.

Donwan is also an enthusiast of American muscle cars from the early 1960s through to 1971.

References

Jeans Engineering, New York Times Magazine.
''.

Year of birth missing (living people)
Living people
American fashion designers
Virginia Commonwealth University alumni
Menswear designers